Labidostomis is a genus of short-horned leaf beetles belonging to the family Chrysomelidae, subfamily Cryptocephalinae.

Species
Species within this genus include:

 Labidostomis amurensis Heyden, 1884
 Labidostomis asiatica Faldermann, 1837
 Labidostomis axillaris (Lacordaire, 1848)
 Labidostomis balcanica Tomov, 1987
 Labidostomis beckeri Weise, 1881
 Labidostomis bolivari Cobos, 1954
 Labidostomis boreopersicus Lopatin, 1997
 Labidostomis centromaculata Gené, 1839
 Labidostomis cheni Lopatin, 1995
 Labidostomis cyanicornis (Germar, 1822)
 Labidostomis damavandensis Rapilly, 1984
 Labidostomis decipiens Faldermann, 1837
 Labidostomis diversifrons Lefèvre, 1872
 Labidostomis funerea Fairmaire, 1891
 Labidostomis ghilianii (Lacordaire, 1848)
 Labidostomis graeca Tomov, 1990
 Labidostomis guerini (Bassi, 1834)
 Labidostomis harazensis Rapilly, 1984
 Labidostomis heinzi (Lopatin, 1993)
 Labidostomis hordei (Fabricius, 1787)
 Labidostomis humeralis (D.H. Schneider, 1792)
 Labidostomis kantneri Warchalowski, 2004
 Labidostomis karamanica Weise, 1900
 Labidostomis laetus Medvedev, 1992
 Labidostomis lepida Lefèvre, 1872
 Labidostomis longimana (Linnaeus, 1760)
 Labidostomis lucida (Germar, 1824)
 Labidostomis lusitanica (Germar, 1824)
 Labidostomis martensi Medvedev, 1983
 Labidostomis mesopotamica Weise, 1900
 Labidostomis metallica Lefèvre, 1872
 Labidostomis nevadensis J. Daniel, 1904
 Labidostomis oertzeni Weise, 1889
 Labidostomis pachysoma L. Medvedev, 1965
 Labidostomis pallidipennis (Gebler, 1830)
 Labidostomis propinqua Faldermann, 1837
 Labidostomis rufa (Waltl, 1838)
 Labidostomis senicula Kraatz, 1872
 Labidostomis shirazicus Lopatin, 1979
 Labidostomis sibirica (Germar, 1824)
 Labidostomis sulcicollis (Lacordaire, 1848)
 Labidostomis taxicornis (Fabricius, 1792)
 Labidostomis tridentata (Linnaeus, 1758)
 Labidostomis tymphristica Tomov, 1990

References 

Chrysomelidae genera
Clytrini
Taxa named by Louis Alexandre Auguste Chevrolat